Final Justice (also known as The Maltese Connection and The Maltese Project) is a 1985 Italian-American action film directed, produced and written by Greydon Clark, and stars Joe Don Baker as a Texas sheriff who overturns a Maltese city to find the mobster who killed his partner.

Plot

Mafiosi Joseph Palermo (Venantino Venantini) and his brother Tony are fleeing across the border after assassinating a building contractor. They get into a car accident and, after killing the driver of the other car, they decide to hijack a car from a local police station. In the ensuing firefight, Palermo shoots and kills the sheriff (Greydon Clark). The gangsters are pursued across the border by the sheriff's deputy, a no-nonsense Apache-descendant named Thomas Jefferson Geronimo III (Baker). He shoots Tony dead and captures Joseph, who swears he will take revenge for his brother's death.

As a publicity stunt, a US State Department official named Wilson (Bill McKinney) orders Geronimo to escort Palermo to Italy. However, the plane is sabotaged and forced to land in Malta. Soon after arriving in Valletta, Geronimo is ambushed by gangsters and Palermo escapes his custody.

The Maltese police, under the command of Superintendent Mifsud (Lino Grech), assure Geronimo that they will recapture Palermo themselves. Chief Wilson telephones and orders Geronimo to return to Texas. But Geronimo is determined to capture Palermo himself. With the help of a local policewoman, Maria Cassar (Helena Dalli), he eventually tracks Palermo to the estate of Don Lamanna, a local bigwig. Geronimo is repeatedly arrested by the Maltese authorities, but always manages to escape and continue his pursuit of the gangster.

Eventually, it turns out that Palermo was in cahoots with Wilson, who had never intended for Geronimo to deliver Palermo to Italy. In the end, Cassar kills Wilson and Geronimo kills Palermo.

Reception
Reception to Final Justice was negative. David Pickering for Corpus Christi Times criticized the film's plot and its use of sex and violence.

Legacy

Mystery Science Theater 3000
In 1999, Final Justice was featured and lampooned in the eighth episode of Mystery Science Theater 3000'''s tenth season. It is the second film starring Baker to be riffed, following Mitchell, to which a few references were made.

The version used in the episode contains a very prominent editing mistake. Early in the film when the sheriff (director Clark) dies, there is a shot of the partner getting killed and collapsing to the ground. Moments later, the same shot is repeated. This error only appears in a television print, and the original Vestron Video release does not.

RiffTrax
In 2017, RiffTrax released a video on demand of Final Justice with a new comedic commentary, distinct from the MST3K version. It is the fourth of Clark's films to receive the RiffTrax treatment, following Angels Revenge, Star Games and Uninvited''.

References

External links
 
 
 Episode guide: 1008- Final Justice

1985 films
1980s English-language films
Final Justice
Films directed by Greydon Clark
1985 action films
Publicity stunts in fiction
Italian crime action films
American crime action films
1980s crime action films
1980s rediscovered films
1980s American films
1980s Italian films